Climbing Great Buildings is a British television series made for the BBC by ITN Productions. The series, first broadcast on BBC Two from 6 to 28 September 2010, consists of fifteen half-hour programmes each featuring one famous British structure from the last 1000 years.

The presentation team use rock climbing techniques to access internal and external parts of each building to illustrate construction techniques and materials and other details not usually visible. The team consists of the architect Dr Jonathan Foyle, the climber Lucy Creamer and camera operator Ian Burton, assisted by a rigging team. Foyle is known for his television presentations of architectural history, which subject he also teaches for Cambridge University's International Division. Creamer provides expert advice and encouragement to Foyle, as well as being a sounding-board for his on-site explanations.

Episodes

*World Heritage Site

See also
Don't Look Down

References

External links
 
 

2010 British television series debuts
2010 British television series endings
BBC television documentaries
English-language television shows
Documentary television series about architecture
Television shows about British architecture